The Death of Celebrity was a one-hour special of Channel 4's popular 100 Greatest programmes. The programme attempted to discover Britain's most pointless celebrity (celebrities who are famous despite having no obvious talent). The programme was hosted by Piers Morgan. Here are the results:

 Victoria Beckham
 David Beckham
 Katie Price
 Abi Titmuss
 Tony Blair
 Jade Goody
 The Royal Family
 Jodie Marsh
 Anyone from Big Brother
 Rebecca Loos

Channel 4 original programming